Mary Gabriel is the author of Love and Capital: Karl and Jenny Marx and the Birth of a Revolution, about Karl Marx and his wife Jenny von Westphalen. It was a finalist for the Pulitzer Prize, the National Book Award and the National Book Critics Circle Award. According to WorldCat, the book is held in 985 libraries. She also wrote Notorious Victoria: The Life of Victoria Woodhull, Uncensored — about suffragette Victoria Woodhull —, and The Art of Acquiring: A Portrait of Etta and Claribel Cone — about collectors and travelers Cone sisters. Her latest book, Ninth Street Women : Lee Krasner, Elaine de Kooning, Grace Hartigan, Joan Mitchell, and Helen Frankenthaler — Five Painters and the Movement That Changed Modern Art, was published in September 2018. Mary Gabriel was educated in the United States and France, and worked in Washington and London as a Reuters editor for nearly two decades.

References

American women historians
Living people
Year of birth missing (living people)
21st-century American historians
21st-century American women writers
Reuters people